The 13th Avenue station was a New York City Subway station on the demolished section of the BMT Culver Line. This station was located at the intersection of 37th Street and 13th Avenue in Brooklyn.

History 

This station opened on March 16, 1919, and had a connection to the B&QT Church Avenue Line streetcar. When the IND South Brooklyn Line was extended to Ditmas Avenue and converted most of the line to the Independent Subway System, the station's service was replaced by the Culver Shuttle. 

On May 28, 1959, the station and the line were reduced from three tracks to two. By December 1960, the shuttle was reduced to a single track and platform due to the December 1960 nor'easter and low ridership. The station finally closed on May 11, 1975. The line was demolished in the 1980s.

Station layout 
This elevated station originally had three tracks and two side platforms, although, near the end of its life, only used one track and one of the side platforms, due to the removal of the other two tracks.

References

External links
Street view of abandoned 13th Avenue station and Station entrance in 1976
Photos of 13th Avenue station

Railway stations in the United States opened in 1919
Railway stations closed in 1975
Defunct BMT Culver Line stations
Former elevated and subway stations in Brooklyn
1919 establishments in New York City
1975 disestablishments in New York (state)